Kirsi Helen (née Perälä, born May 6, 1982 in Forssa) is a Finnish cross-country skier who has competed since 2001. At the 2010 Winter Olympics in Vancouver, she finished 19th in the individual sprint event.

Helen also finished 23rd in the sprint event at the FIS Nordic World Ski Championships 2009 in Liberec.

Her best World Cup finish was fifth twice (2008, 2010), both in sprint events.

Cross-country skiing results
All results are sourced from the International Ski Federation (FIS).

Olympic Games

World Championships

World Cup

Season standings

References

External links

1982 births
Living people
People from Forssa
Cross-country skiers at the 2010 Winter Olympics
Finnish female cross-country skiers
Olympic cross-country skiers of Finland
Sportspeople from Kanta-Häme
21st-century Finnish women